Zakaria Deros was a controversial politician in Malaysia. He was the former Port Klang state assemblyman and Klang municipal councillor from year 2004 to year 2006.

Political career
Zakaria, who was the candidate for BN-UMNO, was elected state assemblyman for Pelabuhan Klang (N46) in the 2004 election. He took over from Dato' Teh Chang Ying (BN - MCA) who won the seat in the 1999 election. However, in the 2008 election, he was not selected as a candidate and was replaced by his daughter-in-law Roselinda Abdul Jamil, which she did not win.

Controversies
Zakaria gained infamy in 2006 when he had a run-in with the law for not submitting building plans for his mansion, dubbed as an istana (palace) by his detractors. He was also found not to have paid the assessment for a property for 12 years, while his family was caught operating an illegal satay restaurant on government reserve land.  His mansion has 21 bathrooms and 16 bedrooms, including 11 that are occupied by each of his children, as well as a VIP room, three living rooms, a dining hall and a prayer room.

The house also has a swimming pool, a bowling room, several gazebos, an orchard, a two-hole golf lawn, an office, a storeroom, two rooms for maids as well as a wet kitchen and a dry kitchen.

Death
On 11 March 2008, Zakaria died at the age of 62 after suffering a heart attack. He had been discussing over dinner the dismal results of the just-concluded 2008 election (in which his party fared poorly, losing Selangor state to the opposition) when he collapsed. He is buried in Malacca.

External links
 Zakaria Deros dies

External links 

1940s births
2008 deaths
Malaysian Muslims
Malaysian people of Malay descent
United Malays National Organisation politicians
Members of the Selangor State Legislative Assembly